is a town located in Chiba Prefecture, Japan. , the town had an estimated population of 14,387 in 6068 households and a population density of 200 persons per km².

Geography
Tako is located in the northeastern portion of Chiba prefecture,  approximately 35 kilometers from then prefectural capital at Chiba and 60 to 70 kilometers from central Tokyo. The west borders Narita International Airport. Located on the Kanto Plain sandwiched between the Shimōsa Plateau and the Kujūkuri Plain, the majority of the land is flat. The Kuriyama River flows through the centre of the town.

Neighboring municipalities
Chiba Prefecture
Sōsa
Katori
Narita
Shibayama
Yokoshibahikari

Climate
Tako has a humid subtropical climate (Köppen Cfa) characterized by warm summers and cool winters with light to no snowfall.  The average annual temperature in Tako is 14.6 °C. The average annual rainfall is 1500 mm with September as the wettest month. The temperatures are highest on average in August, at around 25.8 °C, and lowest in January, at around 4.5 °C.

Demographics
Per Japanese census data, the population of Tako has been decreasing slowly over the past 70 years.

History
Tako has been inhabited since prehistoric times, and archaeologists have found dugout canoes and graves from the Jōmon period, and rice paddies from the Yayoi period. The area also has numerous tumuli from the Kofun period, from which haniwa pottery has been recovered. During the Heian period, it was divided into shōen controlled by the Fujiwara clan and came under the control of the Chiba clan in the Kamakura period. During the Edo period, it was tenryō territory within Shimōsa province ruled directly by the Tokugawa shogunate via hatamoto administrators.

After the Meiji Restoration, Tako village was established on April 1, 1889 within Katori District of Chiba Prefecture with the creation of the modern municipalities ordinance. Tako was elevated to town status on June 29, 1890. On April 1, 1951, Tako annexed neighboring Tōjō Village. It expanded further on March 31, 1954 by annexing neighboring Naka, Kuga and Tokiwa villages.

Government
Tako has a mayor-council form of government with a directly elected mayor and a unicameral town council of 14 members. Tako, together with the city of Katori and town of Kōzaki, contributes two members to the Chiba Prefectural Assembly. In terms of national politics, the town is part of Chiba 10th district of the lower house of the Diet of Japan.

Economy
Tako is a regional commercial center, and agricultural center. In addition to rice, an important economic factor is animal husbandry, most significantly intensive pig farming. Approximately 20% of the workforce commutes to Narita, per the 2010 census.

Education
Tako has three public elementary schools and one public middle school operated by the city government. The town has one public high school operated by the Chiba Prefectural Board of Education and one private high school.

Transportation

Railway
Tako was formerly served by the now-defunct Narita RailwayTako Line from1911 to 1944. It does not currently have any railway service.

Highway

Sister cities
  San Roque, Cádiz, Spain.
  Gilroy, California, United States.

Noted people from Tako
Iizasa Ienao, Muromachi period swordsmaster
Youichi Ui, professional motorcycle racer

References

External links

Official Website 

Towns in Chiba Prefecture
Populated places established in 1954
Tako, Chiba